"Chains Around My Heart" is a song co-written by American musicians Richard Marx and Fee Waybill, originally recorded by Australian singer John Farnham under the title "Chains Around the Heart" as the B-side to his 1990 single "Burn for You". Marx then recorded his own version of the song for his third studio album, Rush Street (1991), and released it as the album's fourth and final single in 1992. Marx's version reached number 44 on the US Billboard Hot 100 chart, number 17 in Canada, and number 29 in the United Kingdom.

Personnel
 Richard Marx – vocals, acoustic piano, Fender Rhodes, keyboards
 Michael Egizi – keyboards 
 Bruce Gaitsch – acoustic guitar 
 Michael Landau – acoustic guitar, electric guitar, guitar solo 
 Jim Cliff – bass 
 Jeff Porcaro – drums
 Chris Trujillo – percussion

Charts

Weekly charts

Year-end charts

Release history

References

1991 singles
1991 songs
Capitol Records singles
John Farnham songs
Richard Marx songs
Songs written by Fee Waybill
Songs written by Richard Marx